Charlie Green may refer to:
 Charlie Green (singer) (born 1997), English child singer
 Charlie Green (album), Charlie Green's debut album
 Charlie Green (musician) (1893–1935), jazz trombonist
 Charlie Green (American football) (born 1943), American football player
 Charlie Green (golfer) (1932–2013), Scottish amateur golfer
 Charlie Green, a pseudonym used by Sammy Davis Jr. on early recordings for Capitol Records

See also
 Charles Green (disambiguation)
 Charles Greene (disambiguation)
 Charlie Greene (disambiguation)